The 2006 NASCAR Nextel Cup Series was the 58th season of professional Stock car racing in the United States and the 35th modern-era NASCAR Cup series season. It was started at Daytona International Speedway on Sunday, February 12 with the Budweiser Shootout and ended on Monday, November 20, with the Ford 400 at Homestead-Miami Speedway. The Chase for the Nextel Cup began with the Sylvania 300 on Sunday, September 17, at New Hampshire International Speedway. This was the last full-time season with the Gen 4 car.

Tony Stewart, driver of the No. 20 Chevrolet for Joe Gibbs Racing, was the defending series champion, but lost out in defending his championship this year, having finished outside of the top 10 in the points standings after the Chevy Rock and Roll 400. He did, however, claim a $1 million (US) bonus as the best finisher outside the Chase for the Nextel Cup drivers, winning three of the ten Chase races. By the end of the season Chevrolet had captured 23 victories, and 270 points to win the NASCAR Manufacturers' Championship over Ford.

The 2006 season was the first for Ford's all-new Fusion, which replaced the Taurus both in NASCAR and in showrooms. Also, a new version of the Chevrolet Monte Carlo, called the Monte Carlo Super Sport (SS for short) debuted on the circuit. Additionally, 2006 was the first Cup Series season since 1979 without Rusty Wallace and 1974 without Ricky Rudd, although Rudd made one appearance in relief and would return for one final year in 2007 before retiring. It was also the last season before Toyota joins the NASCAR Cup Series as a manufacturer.

Teams and drivers

Complete schedule

Limited schedule

Driver changes for 2006 
Several new drivers were in their first stint as regulars on the Nextel Cup circuit in 2006. After winning back-to-back Busch Series championships in 2004 and 2005, Martin Truex Jr. drove the No. 1 Chevrolet for Dale Earnhardt, Inc. (DEI). Vacated by Michael Waltrip, their No. 15 car was driven by rookie Paul Menard and ran a part-time schedule of only seven races.

Waltrip left DEI to drive Bill Davis Racing's new No. 55 car, but ownership was transferred to the newly merged (with the old No. 77 team) Waltrip-Jasper Racing to ensure that Waltrip would compete in the first five races. Despite the change, the No. 55 still received most of its equipment and crew from BDR. On January 23 in Charlotte, North Carolina, as part of the annual Media Tour, NASCAR announced that the Toyota Camry would be added to the series in 2007, meaning that Toyota would become the first non-American car manufacturer to run in the premier series since Jaguar in the mid-1950s. Waltrip-Jasper Racing and BDR became two of the first Toyota teams, although they raced Dodges. They did so without Dodge's support because BDR had raced Toyotas in the Craftsman Truck Series. The team hired Dave Blaney to take the wheel of the No. 22 Dodge. A third Toyota team, carrying the No. 83, was owned by Red Bull Energy Drink, with Brian Vickers as the driver. It was believed that they would also buy the No. 7 Jim Smith-owned team driven by Robby Gordon. 1988 series champion Bill Elliott attempted three races for Red Bull in a Dodge, as the 2006 Camry was not approved for racing. He didn't make any starts in the ride, nor did former Champ Car driver A. J. Allmendinger. With Blaney's departure, the No. 07 Chevy for Richard Childress Racing was driven by Clint Bowyer.

2004 Nextel Cup champion Kurt Busch, who was taken over by in Roush Racing's, replaced a retired Rusty Wallace in the No. 2 Dodge for Penske Racing. 2003 Rookie of the Year Jamie McMurray replaced Busch to drive Roush's No.26 (formerly 97) Ford. In addition, Mark Martin continued his "Salute to You" tour for their No.6 car.

With the egressing of both McMurray and Sterling Marlin from Chip Ganassi Racing with Felix Sabates, Casey Mears became the senior driver and moved to No. 42 Dodge and Reed Sorenson took over his ride in the No. 41. David Stremme replaced Marlin in the No. 40 car. Sold to resort magnate Bob Ginn during the season and formerly numbered 10, Marlin drove the No. 14 car for MB2 Motorsports and Scott Riggs took the No. 10 car to Evernham Motorsports just as they switched from Chevy to Dodge. Jeremy Mayfield and Elliott Sadler were released from Evernham Motorsports and Robert Yates Racing. Sadler drove Evernham's No. 19, and David Gilliland replaced him in RYR No. 38 car; that change took effect for the GFS Marketplace 400.

Jeff Green replaced Mike Bliss in the No. 66 (formerly No. 0) car, which left Petty Enterprises' No. 43 Dodge open for former Joe Gibbs Racing driver Bobby Labonte to step in. His new teammate/team owner Kyle Petty brought sponsorships from Wells Fargo, NTB, and Schwan's to the No. 45 car, with Schwan's moving from the No. 49. Competitive Edge Motorsports ceased operations, and Marathon Petroleum Company sponsored Kyle Petty. J. J. Yeley took over for Labonte in JGR No. 18 Chevrolet. Denny Hamlin, after scoring three Top 10 finishes at the end of the previous season, raced full-time in their newly entered No. 11 car, and he claimed rookie of the year honors, two checkered flags (both at Pocono Raceway, the first rookie to sweep both races in a single season) and third in the Championship standings.

Hall of Fame Racing started operations in 2006. Two-time Cup series champion Terry Labonte drove their No. 96 car for the first five races utilizing the past champions provisional rule, and Tony Raines took over at Martinsville. Labonte wound down his career "Texas Style" in the No. 44 Hendrick Motorsports second car following the Dickies 500 race in November in his home state at Texas Motor Speedway, where he finished 34th.

Brent Sherman took over for Ken Schrader in the No. 49 Dodge for BAM Racing, only to be replaced by Kevin Lepage, who started the season in the No. 61 (formerly No. 66) car for Peak Fitness Racing. Bliss replaced Sherman in the No. 49 as well. Front Row Motorsports hired Chad Chaffin to run for Rookie of the Year and Randy LaJoie (who was replaced by Chad Blount) to run full-time in their No. 34/92 car as well as buying Peak Fitness Racing's No. 61, suspending the 92's operations. Schrader replaced Ricky Rudd in the Wood Brothers No. 21 Ford. Starting this season, Wood Brothers made a partnership with JTG Racing (a Busch Series and Truck Series at that time) to field the No. 21 entry and the team was renamed to Wood Brothers/JTG Racing.

Scott Wimmer took Mike Wallace's place in Morgan-McClure Motorsports's No. 4 Chevrolet but departed when 2002 Daytona 500 champion Ward Burton took over for him late in the season after sitting on the sidelines. Travis Kvapil moved from the Jasper team to Chevrolet for PPI Motorsports. Furniture Row Racing announced it would run full-time with Kenny Wallace driving their No. 78 Chevrolet.

Schedule

Races 

NOTE: An asterisk (*) in each Top Ten finish denotes a rookie driver.

Budweiser Shootout 
This non-points race, which involved the previous season's pole winners and past Shootout winners, was held February 12, 2006, at Daytona International Speedway after a postponement of one day due to rain, and in a major upset, rookie Denny Hamlin won the event. Even though he was classified as a rookie, Hamlin had qualified by winning the pole position for the Checker Auto Parts 500 held November 13, 2005 in Phoenix. Hamlin drove in only 7 Nextel Cup races in 2005.

Daytona 500 

 Complete Results

Qualifying and Gatorade Duels 
Jeff Burton won the pole for the race with a speed of over 189 mph, and would start alongside Jeff Gordon in an all-Chevy front row. Gordon would win the second Gatorade Duel (his third career victory in a Daytona qualifying race) after Elliott Sadler won in race 1, which was delayed by showers.

The race 
The weather dawned cloudy and cold for the 48th running of the "Great American Race", when Jeff Burton led the field to the green at 2:45 pm, which at the time was the latest scheduled start in the history of the race (the reason for this was that NBC chose it as its lead-in program to the primetime portion of its day's coverage of the Winter Olympic Games from Turin). There were several lead changes in the early part of the race going, with a race record of 32. The first caution flew on lap 18 when Martin Truex Jr. hit the wall. During this caution, Burton was passed by Elliott Sadler for the lead a lap later. The race restarted on lap 20 and 4 laps later, Jeff Gordon took the led away from Sadler. Carl Edwards, a popular "dark horse candidate" for the Nextel Cup championship, had his day end early, as he was involved in a five-car pileup on lap 80 that collected Dale Jarrett, Kyle Petty, Jeff Green, J. J. Yeley and Joe Nemechek. This was the biggest crash of the day, since the "Big One" never occurred. This would also bring out the third caution flag. Because of this, Edwards finished 43rd. Tony Stewart was a "magnet for controversy", tangling with Jeff Gordon on lap 48 and Matt Kenseth on lap 106. The first incident (which left debris on the track) brought out the second caution, which ended when the race restarted four laps later, and the second one would bring out the fifth caution. Stewart was penalized for aggressive driving after the incident with Kenseth, in which he blocked the No.17 car into the grass, causing it to spin and hit the wall in turn 3. Kenseth took matters into his own hands and was black-flagged for hitting Stewart's car in retaliation on pit road. The three drivers involved in these two incidents would repair their cars and get back into contention. Kenseth at first failed to answer the black flag, which resulted in NASCAR no longer continuing to score the 17 car for 1 lap. Kenseth would make up the lost lap and catch up to lead lap traffic.

Jimmie Johnson had one of the strongest cars all day. He took the lead with 10 laps to go just as the ninth caution flag came out for an crash involving Gordon, Kurt Busch, Jamie McMurray, and Sterling Marlin. This set up a 10-lap battle for the win. The race was extended into "overtime" when McMurray and Burton collided on lap 197, bringing out yet the 10th caution. The green-white-checkered finish ended when Casey Mears and Ryan Newman battled for second, leaving Johnson to take the victory. The race ended under caution when Greg Biffle crashed in turn 4, just before Johnson crossed the line. The 48th running of the Daytona 500 was the first win for the No. 48 car on a restrictor plate track. This was also Johnson's 19th career win and his first during his streak of five consecutive NASCAR Sprint Cup Championships from 2006 to 2010.

One surprise of this race was Kirk Shelmerdine, who finished 20th. He had barely qualified for the Daytona 500 and his independently owned No. 27 was fielded with a car that had a borrowed engine and donated tires, as well as a team with a volunteer pit crew.

Top Ten Results: (Race distance extended to 203 laps/507.5 miles due to green-white-checkered rule.)

 No. 48 Jimmie Johnson
 No. 42 Casey Mears
 No. 12 Ryan Newman
 No. 38 Elliott Sadler
 No. 20 Tony Stewart
 No. 07 Clint Bowyer *
 No. 25 Brian Vickers
 No. 8 Dale Earnhardt Jr.
 No. 21 Ken Schrader
 No. 88 Dale Jarrett

Failed to qualify: Scott Riggs (No. 10), Kenny Wallace (No. 78), Scott Wimmer (No. 4), Mike Skinner (No. 23), Derrike Cope (No. 74), Larry Gunselman (No. 52), Chad Blount (No. 37), Larry Foyt (No. 50), Andy Belmont (No. 59), Randy LaJoie (No. 64), Morgan Shepherd (No. 89), Chad Chaffin (No. 92), Carl Long (No. 80), Paul Menard (No. 15), Stanton Barrett (No. 95)

 Clint Bowyer scored a top-10 finish in his first full-time Nextel Cup race.
 As of 2022, this was the final Daytona 500 televised by NBC. The NASCAR TV deal for 2001 through 2006 allowed for FOX and NBC to rotate the Daytona 500 and the Pepsi 400 every year. FOX would broadcast the Daytona 500 on odd-numbered years, and NBC would broadcast the race on even-numbered years. FOX would televise every Daytona 500 after the new broadcast rights deal went into effect in 2007.

Auto Club 500 

 Complete Results

Body styles and engines were the story for the second race of the Nextel Cup season, the Auto Club 500 at California Speedway on February 26. Kurt Busch won the pole (187.086 mph) using a 2004 Dodge Intrepid-styled body, as opposed to the new Dodge Charger, which his Penske Racing team believed was aerodynamically superior. Bobby Labonte and the No. 43 team drove the Intrepid as well. Others, including Evernham Motorsports drivers Jeremy Mayfield and Kasey Kahne, drove the Charger.

On race day, Greg Biffle dominated, leading 168 of the first 218 laps. Biffle won the previous year's spring race at California, finished second in the fall, and had won the Busch race the day before. Tony Stewart was the fastest Chevy in the early going. He overcame the car falling off the jack on a pit stop and an unscheduled stop for a flat tire to claw his way back among the leaders only to have an engine failure at lap 215, ending a string of 30 straight races without a DNF. Biffle continued up front until lap 226. He reported to the crew that his engine had lost a cylinder and a few laps later, he retired to the garage. This left Matt Kenseth to take the lead and only a late-race caution kept him from pulling away. Smoke and oil from the No. 4 car of Scott Wimmer brought out a yellow with three laps to go. Kenseth easily held off Jimmie Johnson in the green-white-checkered finish to earn his 11th career win.

Top ten results: (Race distance extended to 502 miles/251 laps due to green-white checkered rule.)
 No. 17 Matt Kenseth
 No. 48 Jimmie Johnson
 No. 99 Carl Edwards
 No. 9 Kasey Kahne
 No. 31 Jeff Burton
 No. 26 Jamie McMurray
 No. 42 Casey Mears
 No. 18 J. J. Yeley *
 No. 6 Mark Martin
 No. 5 Kyle Busch

Failed to qualify: Travis Kvapil (No. 32), Hermie Sadler (No. 00), Derrike Cope (No. 74), Randy LaJoie (No. 34), Morgan Shepherd (No. 89)

UAW-DaimlerChrysler 400 

 Complete Results

After a week off, the Nextel Cup series returned to action at Las Vegas Motor Speedway on March 12, 2006, for the UAW-DaimlerChrysler 400. Greg Biffle clocked the fastest lap in qualifying at 172.403 mph.

In the third consecutive race to require a green-white-checkered finish, Jimmie Johnson blew past Matt Kenseth on the last corner of the day to get his 20th career victory and second of the season. Kenseth looked like a good bet to cruise to victory before Denny Hamlin and Kenny Wallace wrecked three laps from the end, bunching the field and leading to the overtime finish. Before the lap 268 restart, Kenseth told his crew that his engine felt weak, but he was able to protect the lead until the last corner, where Johnson, who had not led all day, overtook the 17 car on the high side to take the win by a half a car length. This was the first time that a green-white-checkered finish occurred in the first three races of the season.

Top Ten Results: (Race distance extended to 270 laps/405 miles due to green-white-checkered rule.)
 No. 48 Jimmie Johnson
 No. 17 Matt Kenseth
 No. 5 Kyle Busch
 No. 9 Kasey Kahne
 No. 24 Jeff Gordon
 No. 6 Mark Martin
 No. 31 Jeff Burton
 No. 16 Greg Biffle
 No. 42 Casey Mears
 No. 11 Denny Hamlin *

Failed to qualify: Stanton Barrett (No. 95), Hermie Sadler (No. 00), Brandon Ash (No. 02), Mike Skinner (No. 37), Morgan Shepherd (No. 89), Randy LaJoie (No. 92)

Golden Corral 500 

 Complete Results

There were no extra laps in race four of the Nextel Cup season, the Golden Corral 500 at Atlanta Motor Speedway, but there was an extra day, as rain showers forced the green flag to be moved to Monday, March 20 at 11 am Television coverage moved to cable's FX channel for the race (with some exceptions).

Kasey Kahne sat on the pole with a speed of 192.553 mph, edging Ryan Newman by .002 seconds. Bill Lester qualified 19th in the No. 23 Dodge Charger, becoming the first African-American to start a NASCAR Nextel Cup race since 1986. He finished 38th, six laps down. Last year's Atlanta winner, Carl Edwards eliminated himself from contention early. He damaged the front end of the 99 car after hitting Dave Blaney on pit road on lap 45 during a caution to address the stopped car of Kyle Busch. Bobby Labonte ran in the top 10 for the first 50 laps before his engine failed on lap 55. Another scary incident took place on pit road during the sixth caution of the day (laps 189–197), when Reed Sorenson hit John Slusher, catch can man for Robby Gordon's crew, as he pulled out of his pit stall. Slusher was attached to a backboard but was treated at the infield care center.

Several rookies had good days at Atlanta. Paul Menard and Reed Sorenson finished in the top ten, and Denny Hamlin led 16 laps. He was forced to make an unscheduled pit stop because of a loose condition, and finished 31st.

On the track, the 9 car was near the front all day. Kahne took the lead from Greg Biffle with 79 laps to go. Despite a charge from Mark Martin, Kahne was not seriously challenged down the stretch and visited victory lane for the second time in his career. Kahne was the first driver to win from the pole since Matt Kenseth in the 2005 Sharpie 500.

Top ten results:
 No. 9 Kasey Kahne
 No. 6 Mark Martin
 No. 8 Dale Earnhardt Jr.
 No. 24 Jeff Gordon
 No. 20 Tony Stewart
 No. 48 Jimmie Johnson
 No. 15 Paul Menard *
 No. 45 Kyle Petty
 No. 88 Dale Jarrett
 No. 41 Reed Sorenson *

Failed to qualify: Mike Garvey (No. 51), Stanton Barrett (No. 95), Chad Chaffin (No. 34), Derrike Cope (No. 74), Kenny Wallace (No. 78), Travis Kvapil (No. 32), Mike Skinner (No. 37), Greg Sacks (No. 13), Chad Blount (No. 92)

Food City 500 

 Complete Results

The fifth race of the season, the Food City 500, was held at Bristol Motor Speedway on March 26, 2006. Qualifying was cancelled on March 24 due to snow, sleet and rain, and the field was set with top 35 owners points from 2005, the Champion's Provisional (for Terry Labonte) and seven others, based on qualifying attempts in 2006. As a result, 2005 champion Tony Stewart sat on pole.

The race featured 18 cautions, and over 100 of the 500 laps were run under the yellow flag. Points leader Jimmie Johnson made contact with the car of Reed Sorenson which caused a flat tire and put the 48 car multiple laps down. He finished 30th. Lap 188 saw the most notable wreck of the first half of the race, as Clint Bowyer spun Dave Blaney, causing a chain reaction that collected David Stremme, Brian Vickers and Michael Waltrip and brought out a red flag to clean up.

Jeff Gordon spun Martin Truex Jr. out on lap 415 in an incident that collected Jeff Burton, Robby Gordon and J. J. Yeley. Kurt Busch, who had made up two laps lost earlier in the day due to tire problems, used the "bump-and-run" to nudge Matt Kenseth out of the lead with four laps to go. Jeff Gordon used the same tactic to take third, but on the final lap, Kenseth used the bump and run to spin Gordon out as Busch raced to victory. Gordon finished 21st and was involved in a shoving match with Kenseth.

The win was Busch's fifth in 11 career races at the Tennessee track and the fifteenth in his career. It was Dodge's first win at Bristol since Richard Petty in 1975.

Top ten results:
 No. 2 Kurt Busch
 No. 29 Kevin Harvick
 No. 17 Matt Kenseth
 No. 99 Carl Edwards
 No. 43 Bobby Labonte
 No. 6 Mark Martin
 No. 16 Greg Biffle
 No. 5 Kyle Busch
 No. 12 Ryan Newman
 No. 9 Kasey Kahne

Failed to qualify: Chad Chaffin (No. 34), Mike Skinner (No. 37), Mike Garvey (No. 51), Derrike Cope (No. 74), Kenny Wallace (No. 78), Morgan Shepherd (No. 89), Chad Blount (No. 92).

DirecTV 500 

 Complete Results

The sixth race of the season, the DirecTV 500, was held at Martinsville Speedway on April 2, 2006. Jimmie Johnson won the pole.

Top ten results:
 No. 20 Tony Stewart
 No. 24 Jeff Gordon
 No. 48 Jimmie Johnson
 No. 8 Dale Earnhardt Jr.
 No. 5 Kyle Busch
 No. 38 Elliott Sadler
 No. 29 Kevin Harvick
 No. 25 Brian Vickers
 No. 26 Jamie McMurray
 No. 10 Scott Riggs

Failed to qualify: Derrike Cope (No. 74), Kevin Lepage (No. 61), Kenny Wallace (No. 78), Jimmy Spencer (No. 49), Morgan Shepherd (No. 89), Hermie Sadler (No. 00).

Samsung/Radio Shack 500 

 Complete Results

The Samsung/Radio Shack 500, the seventh race of the season was held at Texas Motor Speedway on April 9, 2006. Kasey Kahne won the pole.

Top ten results:
 No. 9 Kasey Kahne
 No. 17 Matt Kenseth
 No. 20 Tony Stewart
 No. 11 Denny Hamlin *
 No. 29 Kevin Harvick
 No. 31 Jeff Burton
 No. 10 Scott Riggs
 No. 1 Martin Truex Jr. *
 No. 6 Mark Martin
 No. 43 Bobby Labonte

Failed to qualify: Brent Sherman (No. 49), Chad Blount (No. 92), Kenny Wallace (No. 78), Chad Chaffin (No. 34), Stanton Barrett (No. 95).

Subway Fresh 500 

 Complete Results

The Subway Fresh 500, the eighth race of the season was held at Phoenix International Raceway on April 22, 2006. Kyle Busch won the pole.

Top ten results:
 No. 29 Kevin Harvick
 No. 20 Tony Stewart
 No. 17 Matt Kenseth
 No. 99 Carl Edwards
 No. 07 Clint Bowyer *
 No. 9 Kasey Kahne
 No. 48 Jimmie Johnson
 No. 43 Bobby Labonte
 No. 31 Jeff Burton
 No. 24 Jeff Gordon

Failed to qualify: Chad Chaffin (No. 34), Mike Garvey (No. 51), Chad Blount (No. 92), Kevin Lepage (No. 61), Morgan Shepherd (No. 89), Steve Portenga (No. 52)

Aaron's 499 

 Complete Results

The ninth race of the season, the Aaron's 499, was scheduled to be held at Talladega Superspeedway on April 30, 2006. However, due to rain starting one lap prior to the green flag, the event was postponed until the following day. Television coverage was moved from Fox to FX except for several Fox stations which elected to carry the race. Elliott Sadler won the pole. The Aaron's 499 was one of five impound races this year in the Nextel Cup Series.

Top ten results:
 No. 48 Jimmie Johnson
 No. 20 Tony Stewart
 No. 25 Brian Vickers
 No. 31 Jeff Burton
 No. 26 Jamie McMurray
 No. 17 Matt Kenseth
 No. 2 Kurt Busch
 No. 99 Carl Edwards
 No. 10 Scott Riggs
 No. 7 Robby Gordon

Failed to qualify: Morgan Shepherd (No. 89), Stanton Barrett (No. 95), Mike Wallace (No. 09), Chad Blount (No. 92), Brent Sherman (No. 49), Kenny Wallace (No. 78)

 With the win, Jimmie Johnson completed the Career Grand Slam. (Daytona 500, spring Talladega race, Coca-Cola 600, Southern 500)

Crown Royal 400 

 Complete Results

The Crown Royal 400, NASCAR's tenth race of the season was held at Richmond International Raceway on May 6, 2006. Greg Biffle won the pole. This was the second impound race of the 2006 season.

Top ten results:
 No. 8 Dale Earnhardt Jr.
 No. 11 Denny Hamlin *
 No. 29 Kevin Harvick
 No. 16 Greg Biffle
 No. 5 Kyle Busch
 No. 20 Tony Stewart
 No. 99 Carl Edwards
 No. 12 Ryan Newman
 No. 14 Sterling Marlin
 No. 07 Clint Bowyer *

Failed to qualify: Kertus Davis (No. 89), Chad Chaffin (No. 34), Stanton Barrett (No. 95), Hermie Sadler (No. 00)

 This was Dale Earnhardt Jr.'s final win driving for Dale Earnhardt, Inc. Earnhardt Jr. went winless in 2007 before joining Hendrick Motorsports in 2008.
 Final career Top 10 finish for Sterling Marlin.

Dodge Charger 500 

 Complete Results

The Dodge Charger 500, the eleventh race of the season was held at Darlington Raceway on May 13, 2006. Kasey Kahne won the pole.

Top ten results:

 No. 16 Greg Biffle
 No. 24 Jeff Gordon
 No. 17 Matt Kenseth
 No. 48 Jimmie Johnson
 No. 8 Dale Earnhardt Jr.
 No. 12 Ryan Newman
 No. 5 Kyle Busch
 No. 6 Mark Martin
 No. 31 Jeff Burton
 No. 11 Denny Hamlin *

Failed to qualify: Chad Chaffin (No. 61), Kenny Wallace (No. 78), Carl Long (No. 37), Chad Blount (No. 34)

Nextel Open 
The first of two non-points doubleheader races was held May 20, 2006, at Lowe's Motor Speedway. Scott Riggs won the pole, and would go on to win after having led every single lap.

Top Ten Results
 10- Scott Riggs
 66- Jeff Green
 25- Brian Vickers
 11- Denny Hamlin*
 18- J. J. Yeley*
 40- David Stremme*
 31- Jeff Burton
 14- Sterling Marlin
 7- Robby Gordon
 21- Ken Schrader

Nextel All-Star Challenge 
The second non-points race was held May 20, 2006, at Lowe's Motor Speedway. Kasey Kahne won the pole in the unique three-lap qualifier that included a required four-tire pit stop.

Top Ten Results
 48- Jimmie Johnson
 29- Kevin Harvick
 24- Jeff Gordon
 99- Carl Edwards
 12- Ryan Newman
 43- Bobby Labonte
 88- Dale Jarrett
 45- Kyle Petty +
 8- Dale Earnhardt Jr.
 10- Scott Riggs §

+ – Was selected by fans in a poll to participate following Nextel Open.

§ – Winner of Nextel Open.

Coca-Cola 600 

 Complete Results

The twelfth points-paying race, the Coca-Cola 600, NASCAR's longest race in terms of distance, was run on May 28, 2006, at Lowe's Motor Speedway. Scott Riggs won the pole.

Top Ten Results:

 No. 9 Kasey Kahne
 No. 48 Jimmie Johnson
 No. 99 Carl Edwards
 No. 6 Mark Martin
 No. 17 Matt Kenseth
 No. 31 Jeff Burton
 No. 16 Greg Biffle
 No. 26 Jamie McMurray
 No. 11 Denny Hamlin *
 No. 41 Reed Sorenson *

Failed to qualify: Kevin Lepage (No. 49), Hermie Sadler (No. 00), Chad Chaffin (No. 61), Michael Waltrip (No. 55)+, Stanton Barrett (No. 95), Mike Garvey (No. 51), Chad Blount (No. 34), Carl Long (No. 37), Kirk Shelmerdine (No. 27), and Kertus Davis (No. 72).

 Jimmie Johnson would come up one spot short on his quest to win 5 straight races at Charlotte Motor Speedway. He would also fail to break out of a 3-way tie with Bill Elliott and Dale Earnhardt Jr. by trying to win 5 straight superspeedway races at one track.
+ Michael Waltrip failed to qualify, but he bought Derrike Cope's 43rd starting spot (No. 74).

 Kyle Busch was fined $50,000 (US) and had 25 championship points deducted for throwing his HANS device at Casey Mears after an accident.

Neighborhood Excellence 400 presented by Bank of America 

 Complete Results

The thirteenth race of the season, the Neighborhood Excellence 400 presented by Bank of America, was held at Dover International Speedway on June 4, 2006. Ryan Newman won the pole for this race.

Top ten results:
 No. 17 Matt Kenseth
 No. 26 Jamie McMurray
 No. 29 Kevin Harvick
 No. 31 Jeff Burton
 No. 5 Kyle Busch
 No. 48 Jimmie Johnson
 No. 9 Kasey Kahne
 No. 16 Greg Biffle
 No. 6 Mark Martin
 No. 8 Dale Earnhardt Jr.

Failed to qualify: Carl Long (No. 34), Donnie Neuenberger (No. 52), Chad Chaffin (No. 61), and Stanton Barrett (No. 95).

 Tony Stewart was injured at Charlotte and needed relief from Ricky Rudd, who was taking a year off from racing.
 As of 2022, this was the final NASCAR Cup Series race aired on FX.

Pocono 500 

 Complete Results

The Pocono 500, the fourteenth race of the season was held at Pocono Raceway on June 11, 2006. Denny Hamlin sat on pole and led 49 of the first 50 laps before crashing and coming back from 40th place to become the first rookie to win in 2006.

Top Ten Results:

 No. 11 Denny Hamlin *
 No. 2 Kurt Busch
 No. 20 Tony Stewart
 No. 25 Brian Vickers
 No. 17 Matt Kenseth
 No. 16 Greg Biffle
 No. 9 Kasey Kahne
 No. 10 Scott Riggs
 No. 31 Jeff Burton
 No. 48 Jimmie Johnson

Failed to qualify: Scott Wimmer (No. 4), Derrike Cope (No. 74), Stanton Barrett (No. 95), Greg Sacks (No. 34), Brent Sherman (No. 72)

 This was Denny Hamlin's first career Cup victory.

3M Performance 400 
 Complete Results

The fifteenth race of the season, the 3M Performance 400, was held at Michigan International Speedway on June 18, 2006. Kasey Kahne won the pole.

Top Ten Results: (Race called after 129 laps/258 miles because of rain.)
 No. 9 Kasey Kahne
 No. 99 Carl Edwards
 No. 8 Dale Earnhardt Jr.
 No. 16 Greg Biffle
 No. 41 Reed Sorenson *
 No. 48 Jimmie Johnson
 No. 42 Casey Mears
 No. 24 Jeff Gordon
 No. 2 Kurt Busch
 No. 29 Kevin Harvick

Failed to qualify: Carl Long (No. 37), Mike Garvey (No. 51), Chad Chaffin (No. 61), Jimmy Spencer (No. 78)

Dodge/Save Mart 350 
 Complete Results

Race number sixteen on the 2006 schedule was the Dodge/Save Mart 350, the 100th road race in Cup history. The race was held at Infineon Raceway on June 25, 2006. Kurt Busch won the pole.

Top Ten Results:

 No. 24 Jeff Gordon
 No. 12 Ryan Newman
 No. 96 Terry Labonte *
 No. 8 Dale Earnhardt Jr.
 No. 2 Kurt Busch
 No. 99 Carl Edwards
 No. 31 Jeff Burton
 No. 38 Elliott Sadler
 No. 60 Boris Said *
 No. 48 Jimmie Johnson

Failed to qualify: Johnny Miller (No. 34), Chris Cook (No. 49), Travis Kvapil (No. 78), Stanton Barrett (No. 95), Brian Simo (No. 61)

 Tom Hubert in this race, had his third-consecutive 43rd-place finish at Sonoma going back to 2003.
 Terry Labonte running a part-time schedule for Hendrick Motorsports and Hall of Fame Racing, finished an amazing third-place finish in the #96 DLP HD TV Chevrolet, after leading the race with less than 20 laps to go.
 Boris Said made his debut as a NASCAR team owner with the SoBe - No Fear Energy #60 Ford Fusion, in which he led 1 lap and finished in 9th place.
 Final career Top 5 for Terry Labonte.

Pepsi 400 

 Complete Results

The Pepsi 400, the traditional "halfway point" of the season, and the seventeenth race of the season, was held at Daytona International Speedway on July 1, 2006. Veteran driver Boris Said won the pole, his first on an oval. He had a great run as he ran in the top ten nearly the entire race. Because of a strategy call by his crew chief with three laps to go Said led the race but Tony Stewart got by Said for the win just before the white flag waved. Said ended up fourth and emotionally said after the race that his performance was the highlight of his career. This race was the third impound race of the season.

Top ten results:
 No. 20 Tony Stewart
 No. 5 Kyle Busch
 No. 2 Kurt Busch
 No. 60 Boris Said
 No. 17 Matt Kenseth
 No. 38 Elliott Sadler
 No. 42 Casey Mears
 No. 26 Jamie McMurray
 No. 29 Kevin Harvick
 No. 07 Clint Bowyer *

Failed to qualify: Scott Wimmer (No. 4), Kevin Lepage (No. 49), Kenny Wallace (No. 78), Chad Blount (No. 34), Kertus Davis (No. 72)

USG Sheetrock 400 

 Complete Results

The USG Sheetrock 400, the Nextel Cup Series' eighteenth race of the season, was held at Chicagoland Speedway on July 9, 2006. Jeff Burton won the pole. Jeff Gordon won his second race of the year after the race was extended to 270 laps due to a green-white-checkered finish after spinning out leader Matt Kenseth with three laps remaining.

Top Ten Results: (Race distance extended to 270 laps/405 miles due to green-white-checkered rule.)

 No. 24 Jeff Gordon
 No. 31 Jeff Burton
 No. 5 Kyle Busch
 No. 29 Kevin Harvick
 No. 8 Dale Earnhardt Jr.
 No. 48 Jimmie Johnson
 No. 41 Reed Sorenson *
 No. 2 Kurt Busch
 No. 07 Clint Bowyer *
 No. 18 J. J. Yeley *

Failed to qualify: Paul Menard (No. 15), Kevin Lepage (No. 61), Chad Blount (No. 61), Brent Sherman (No. 04), Mike Garvey (No. 51), Derrike Cope (No. 74), Carl Long (No. 34)

Lenox Industrial Tools 300 
 Complete Results

The nineteenth race of the season, the Lenox Industrial Tools 300, was held at New Hampshire International Speedway on July 16, 2006. Ryan Newman won his second pole of the season. Kyle Busch got his first win of 2006 in a race extended by the green-white-checkered finish rule in which a caution setting up the green-white-checkered finish was extended due to another crash under caution involving Michael Waltrip and Robby Gordon just before the green flag was to have flown on lap 304.

Top Ten Results: (Race distance extended to 308 laps/308 miles due to green-white-checkered rule.)
 No. 5 Kyle Busch
 No. 99 Carl Edwards
 No. 16 Greg Biffle
 No. 6 Mark Martin
 No. 29 Kevin Harvick
 No. 11 Denny Hamlin *
 No. 31 Jeff Burton
 No. 9 Kasey Kahne
 No. 48 Jimmie Johnson
 No. 10 Scott Riggs

Failed to qualify: Ted Christopher (No. 61), Joey McCarthy (No. 34), Derrike Cope (No. 74), Morgan Shepherd (No. 89)

Pennsylvania 500 
 Complete Results

The twentieth race of the season, the Pennsylvania 500, was held at Pocono Raceway on July 23, 2006. Denny Hamlin took the pole in qualifying and went on to win the race, earning his second career win and sweeping both races at Pocono. Hamlin led 151 of the race's 200 laps.

Top Ten Results:

 No. 11 Denny Hamlin *
 No. 2 Kurt Busch
 No. 24 Jeff Gordon
 No. 25 Brian Vickers
 No. 29 Kevin Harvick
 No. 48 Jimmie Johnson
 No. 20 Tony Stewart
 No. 43 Bobby Labonte
 No. 31 Jeff Burton
 No. 1 Martin Truex Jr. *

Failed to qualify: Greg Sacks (No. 34), Stanton Barrett (No. 52), Derrike Cope (No. 74), Jimmy Spencer (No. 78)‡

 ‡ – Chad Chaffin originally qualified in the No. 61 car, but his time was disqualified due to failing a post-qualifying inspection. Spencer took his place in the grid as he was the fastest of the four who failed to qualify on time.
 Last career start for Jimmy Spencer.

Allstate 400 at the Brickyard 

 Complete Results

The Allstate 400 at the Brickyard, the twenty-first race of the season and the second richest race on the Nextel Cup circuit, was held at Indianapolis Motor Speedway on August 6, 2006. Jeff Burton won the pole. Jimmie Johnson came back from 38th place to become the second driver to win both the Daytona 500 and the Allstate 400 in the same season, first accomplished by Dale Jarrett in 1996.

Top Ten Results:

 No. 48 Jimmie Johnson
 No. 17 Matt Kenseth
 No. 29 Kevin Harvick
 No. 07 Clint Bowyer *
 No. 6 Mark Martin
 No. 8 Dale Earnhardt Jr.
 No. 5 Kyle Busch
 No. 99 Carl Edwards
 No. 20 Tony Stewart
 No. 2 Kurt Busch

Failed to qualify: Paul Menard (No. 15), Michael Waltrip (No. 55), Johnny Sauter (No. 70), Kevin Lepage (No. 49), Stephen Leicht (No. 90), Bobby Hamilton Jr. (No. 04), Derrike Cope (No. 61)

 The caution flag came out after Jimmie Johnson took the white flag, officially ending this race under caution.

AMD at The Glen 
 Complete Results

The AMD at The Glen, NASCAR's second and final road course race of the season and the twenty-second race on the season, was held at Watkins Glen International on August 13, 2006. Kurt Busch won the pole.

Top Ten Results:

 No. 29 Kevin Harvick
 No. 20 Tony Stewart
 No. 26 Jamie McMurray
 No. 7 Robby Gordon
 No. 99 Carl Edwards
 No. 40 Scott Pruett
 No. 38 Elliott Sadler
 No. 12 Ryan Newman
 No. 5 Kyle Busch
 No. 11 Denny Hamlin *

Failed to qualify: Chris Cook (No. 49), Max Papis (No. 78), Tom Hubert (No. 27), David Murry (No. 37), Dale Quarterley (No. 72), Johnny Miller (No. 92), Brandon Ash (No. 02)

 This would be the last race for Sadler in the No. 38 car. As of August 20, he became the driver of Evernham Motorsports' No. 19 Dodge.

GFS Marketplace 400 
 Complete Results

The GFS Marketplace 400, the twenty-third race of the season was held at Michigan International Speedway August 20, 2006. Jeff Burton won his fourth pole of the year. Matt Kenseth held off Jeff Gordon in the closing laps to earn his third victory of the season.

Top Ten Results:

 No. 17 Matt Kenseth
 No. 24 Jeff Gordon
 No. 20 Tony Stewart
 No. 9 Kasey Kahne
 No. 6 Mark Martin
 No. 8 Dale Earnhardt Jr.
 No. 16 Greg Biffle
 No. 41 Reed Sorenson
 No. 11 Denny Hamlin *
 No. 19 Elliott Sadler

Failed to qualify: Scott Wimmer (No. 4), Mike Skinner (No. 34), Chad Chaffin (No. 61), Kenny Wallace (No. 78)

Sharpie 500 
 Complete Results

One of the most popular races on the circuit, the Sharpie 500, NASCAR's twenty-fourth race of the season was held on August 26, 2006, under the lights on the 0.533-mile Bristol International Speedway. Kurt Busch won the pole for this event. Matt Kenseth won his second straight Nextel Cup race and, along with points leader Jimmie Johnson, clinched a berth in the Chase for the Nextel Cup.

Top Ten Results:

 No. 17 Matt Kenseth +
 No. 5 Kyle Busch
 No. 8 Dale Earnhardt Jr.
 No. 10 Scott Riggs
 No. 24 Jeff Gordon
 No. 11 Denny Hamlin *
 No. 99 Carl Edwards
 No. 12 Ryan Newman
 No. 31 Jeff Burton
 No. 48 Jimmie Johnson +

Failed to qualify: Chad Chaffin (No. 61), Hermie Sadler (No. 00), Mike Wallace (No. 09), Mike Skinner (No. 37). NOTE: Morgan Shepard (No. 89) and Stanton Barrett (No. 30) withdrew from qualifying.

+ – Clinched a spot in the Chase for the Nextel Cup.

Sony HD 500 

 Complete Results

The twenty-fifth race, and the penultimate race prior to the Chase for the Nextel Cup was the Sony HD 500, held at California Speedway on September 3, 2006. Kurt Busch won the pole.

Top ten results:
 No. 9 Kasey Kahne
 No. 8 Dale Earnhardt Jr.
 No. 07 Clint Bowyer *
 No. 99 Carl Edwards
 No. 24 Jeff Gordon
 No. 11 Denny Hamlin *
 No. 17 Matt Kenseth
 No. 5 Kyle Busch
 No. 20 Tony Stewart
 No. 88 Dale Jarrett

Failed to qualify: Todd Kluever (No. 06), Kertus Davis (No. 34), Chad Chaffin (No. 61), Bill Lester (No. 23)

Chevy Rock and Roll 400 
 Complete Results

The twenty-sixth and final race prior to the Chase, the Chevy Rock and Roll 400 was held at Richmond International Raceway on September 9, 2006. Following this race, the top ten drivers in point qualified for the ten-race Chase. Richmond-area native Denny Hamlin won the pole in front of his hometown fans, and clinched a spot in the Chase for the Nextel Cup. This was the season's fourth impound race.

Top ten results:

 No. 29 Kevin Harvick +
 No. 5 Kyle Busch +
 No. 9 Kasey Kahne +
 No. 22 Dave Blaney
 No. 6 Mark Martin +
 No. 16 Greg Biffle
 No. 21 Ken Schrader
 No. 17 Matt Kenseth
 No. 31 Jeff Burton +
 No. 10 Scott Riggs

Failed to qualify: Derrike Cope (No. 74), Mike Wallace (No. 09), Michael Waltrip (No. 55), Hermie Sadler (No. 00), Ted Christopher (No. 27)

+ – Clinched spots in the Chase for the Nextel Cup.

Making The Chase - The following 10 drivers made the Chase for the Cup field in 2006:

 17 - Matt Kenseth
 48 - Jimmie Johnson
 29 - Kevin Harvick
 5 - Kyle Busch
 11 - Denny Hamlin
 8 - Dale Earnhardt Jr.
 6 - Mark Martin
 31 - Jeff Burton
 24 - Jeff Gordon
 9 - Kasey Kahne

Chase for the Nextel Cup 

With the top ten positions all locked in, the playoff began.

In the top ten results, a • indicates one of the 10 drivers who made the Chase for the Nextel Cup.

Sylvania 300 

 Complete Results

The Sylvania 300, the first race in the 2006 Chase for the Nextel Cup, was held September 17 at New Hampshire International Speedway. Kevin Harvick won the pole and the race, becoming the overall points leader for the first time in his career.

Top ten results:

 No. 29 Kevin Harvick •
 No. 20 Tony Stewart
 No. 24 Jeff Gordon •
 No. 11 Denny Hamlin * •
 No. 25 Brian Vickers
 No. 19 Elliott Sadler
 No. 31 Jeff Burton •
 No. 18 J. J. Yeley *
 No. 22 Dave Blaney
 No. 17 Matt Kenseth •

Failed to qualify: Stanton Barrett (No. 30), Derrike Cope (No. 74), Carl Long (No. 46), Kenny Wallace (No. 78), Chad Blount (No. 34)

Dover 400 

 Complete Results

The Dover 400, the second race of the 2006 Chase, was held September 24 at Dover International Speedway. Jeff Gordon won the pole. Jeff Burton broke a 175-race winless streak after getting alongside Matt Kenseth several times between Laps 385–395. Kenseth ran out of fuel at the white flag.

Top Ten results:

 No. 31 Jeff Burton •
 No. 99 Carl Edwards
 No. 24 Jeff Gordon •
 No. 2 Kurt Busch
 No. 16 Greg Biffle
 No. 1 Martin Truex Jr.
 No. 43 Bobby Labonte
 No. 07 Clint Bowyer
 No. 11 Denny Hamlin *•
 No. 17 Matt Kenseth •

Failed to qualify: Morgan Shepherd (No. 89), Kenny Wallace (No. 78), Chad Blount (No. 34), Donnie Neuenberger (No. 52)

Banquet 400 presented by ConAgra Foods 

 Complete Results

The third race of the 2006 Chase, the Banquet 400, was held October 1 at Kansas Speedway in Kansas City, Kansas. Kasey Kahne won the pole. Tony Stewart captured his third win of the year despite running the last half of the final lap with no fuel.

Top ten results:
 No. 20 Tony Stewart
 No. 42 Casey Mears
 No. 6 Mark Martin •
 No. 88 Dale Jarrett
 No. 31 Jeff Burton •
 No. 99 Carl Edwards
 No. 5 Kyle Busch •
 No. 25 Brian Vickers
 No. 07 Clint Bowyer *
 No. 8 Dale Earnhardt Jr. •

Failed to qualify: Scott Wimmer (No. 4), Kevin Lepage (No. 49), Chad Blount (No. 92), Carl Long (No. 46)
 This marked the first time that NBC broadcast in 1080i (HDTV) provided by Sony as the official HDTV sponsor of NASCAR on NBC in the next 8 races of the chase until the 2006 Ford 400, which was the last race of NASCAR on NBC broadcast until 2015.
 Final career Top 5 for Dale Jarrett.

UAW-Ford 500 

 Complete Results

Considered the wild card track of the Chase, the fourth race on the 2006 Chase, the UAW-Ford 500 was held on the newly repaved Talladega Superspeedway Sunday, October 8, 2006. The repaving was the first on the 2.66-mile trioval since 1979. David Gilliland won his first career pole. This race was the fifth and final impound race of the season. Brian Vickers won his first Nextel Cup race when he was declared the winner after he, Jimmie Johnson, and Dale Earnhardt Jr. made contact on the final lap.

Top ten results:
 No. 25 Brian Vickers
 No. 9 Kasey Kahne •
 No. 2 Kurt Busch
 No. 17 Matt Kenseth •
 No. 1 Martin Truex Jr. *
 No. 29 Kevin Harvick •
 No. 66 Jeff Green
 No. 43 Bobby Labonte
 No. 6 Mark Martin •
 No. 99 Carl Edwards

Failed to qualify: Hermie Sadler (No. 00), Todd Bodine (No. 4), Kirk Shelmerdine (No. 27), Travis Kvapil (No. 32), Kevin Lepage (No. 34), Chad Chaffin (No. 61)
 First career top 5 for Martin Truex Jr.

Bank of America 500 

 Complete Results

Race number five on the 2006 Chase, and the halfway point of the playoff, the Bank of America 500, was held on Saturday, October 14, 2006, at Lowe's Motor Speedway in Concord, North Carolina. The event was the only Saturday night race in the Chase. Scott Riggs won the pole, and Kurt Busch had his 3rd-place run disqualified due to an unapproved right rear shock absorber. It cost him 50 points (along with a similar deduction for Penske Racing) and $25,000 (US) in fines as well as a four race suspension for his crew chief.

Top ten results:

 No. 9 Kasey Kahne •
 No. 48 Jimmie Johnson •
 No. 31 Jeff Burton •
 No. 8 Dale Earnhardt Jr. •
 No. 43 Bobby Labonte
 No. 5 Kyle Busch •
 No. 96 Tony Raines
 No. 99 Carl Edwards
 No. 01 Joe Nemechek
 No. 25 Brian Vickers

Failed to qualify: Bill Elliott (No. 83), Kevin Lepage (No. 34), Derrike Cope (No. 74), Chad Chaffin (No. 61), Hermie Sadler (No. 00), Kirk Shelmerdine (No. 27), Carl Long (No. 46), Kenny Wallace (No. 78), Morgan Shepherd (No. 89)

Subway 500 

 Complete Results

The sixth event on the Chase, the Subway 500, was held on October 22, 2006, at Martinsville Speedway outside Martinsville, Virginia. The .526-mile track is the shortest in the Nextel Cup series and the Chase as well. Kurt Busch won his sixth pole of the season. Ward Burton, the 2002 Daytona 500 champion, returned to the circuit to drive the Morgan-McClure No. 4 Chevy after a two-year absence.

Top ten results:

 No. 48 Jimmie Johnson •
 No. 11 Denny Hamlin *•
 No. 43 Bobby Labonte
 No. 20 Tony Stewart
 No. 24 Jeff Gordon •
 No. 42 Casey Mears
 No. 9 Kasey Kahne •
 No. 66 Jeff Green
 No. 29 Kevin Harvick •
 No. 45 Kyle Petty

Failed to qualify: Mike Bliss (No. 49), Hermie Sadler (No. 00), Chad Chaffin (No. 61), Morgan Shepherd (No. 89), Ted Christopher (No. 27), Derrike Cope (No. 74), Stanton Barrett (No. 30)

Bass Pro Shops 500 
 Complete Results

The seventh Chase event, the Bass Pro Shops 500 was held at Atlanta Motor Speedway, located in Hampton, Georgia, on October 29. Qualifying was rained out, and the starting order was set by owner points, with Matt Kenseth sitting on the pole. Tony Stewart captured his second race win in a 2006 Chase race.

Top ten results:
 No. 20 Tony Stewart
 No. 48 Jimmie Johnson •
 No. 8 Dale Earnhardt Jr. •
 No. 17 Matt Kenseth •
 No. 16 Greg Biffle
 No. 24 Jeff Gordon •
 No. 99 Carl Edwards
 No. 11 Denny Hamlin *•
 No. 01 Joe Nemechek
 No. 7 Robby Gordon

Failed to qualify: Derrike Cope (No. 74), Kirk Shelmerdine (No. 27), Mike Skinner (No. 72), A. J. Allmendinger (No. 84)

 In a video replay shown by NBC after the race, it was determined that Robby Gordon deliberately and willfully caused a late-race caution by throwing out his rollbar padding (for which he got the free pass to the lead lap). For that, he was docked 50 owner and driver points, fined $15,000 and placed on probation until December 31.

Dickies 500 

 Complete Results

The eighth Chase race, the Dickies 500, was run on November 5, 2006, at Texas Motor Speedway in Fort Worth, Texas. Brian Vickers won the pole for this race. Tony Stewart won his third race of the chase.

Top Ten Results: (Race distance extended to 339 laps/508.5 miles due to green-white-checkered rule.)

 No. 20 Tony Stewart
 No. 48 Jimmie Johnson •
 No. 29 Kevin Harvick •
 No. 5 Kyle Busch •
 No. 07 Clint Bowyer
 No. 8 Dale Earnhardt Jr. •
 No. 42 Casey Mears
 No. 2 Kurt Busch
 No. 24 Jeff Gordon •
 No. 11 Denny Hamlin *•

Failed to qualify: Chad Chaffin (No. 34), Bill Elliott (No. 37), David Ragan (No. 60), Kevin Lepage (No. 61), Mike Skinner (No. 72), Derrike Cope (No. 74), A. J. Allmendinger (No. 84)

 Following this race, Craig Curione, the front tire carrier for the No. 10 Evernham Dodge driven by Scott Riggs, shoved Kevin Harvick, his wife Delana and NASCAR official John Sacco to the pavement after Harvick was blamed for a late-race incident that led to the green-white-checkered finish. Curione was suspended indefinitely and fined $10,000 by NASCAR and fired from Evernham, while Sacco suffered a sprained ankle.

Checker Auto Parts 500 

 Complete Results

The ninth race on the Chase for the Nextel Cup, the Checker Auto Parts 500, was held at Phoenix International Raceway in Avondale, Arizona on November 12, 2006. Kevin Harvick won the race.

Top Ten Results:

 No. 29 Kevin Harvick •
 No. 48 Jimmie Johnson•
 No. 11 Denny Hamlin *•
 No. 24 Jeff Gordon •
 No. 99 Carl Edwards
 No. 6 Mark Martin •
 No. 9 Kasey Kahne •
 No. 2 Kurt Busch
 No. 8 Dale Earnhardt Jr. •
 No. 31 Jeff Burton •

Failed to qualify: Jason Leffler (No. 71), Todd Kluever (No. 06), Morgan Shepherd (No. 89), Brandon Ash (No. 02), Kevin Lepage (No. 34), Kenny Wallace (No. 78), Derrike Cope (No. 74), Jeremy Mayfield (No. 09)

Ford 400 

 Complete Results

The final race of the season, and the last race in the 2006 Chase for the Nextel Cup, the Ford 400, was run on November 19, 2006, at Homestead-Miami Speedway in Homestead, Florida. Kasey Kahne won the pole, and won the Bud Pole Award overall championship for 2006, while for the second straight week, Bill Elliott used the Championship Provisional. Juan Pablo Montoya, making his Nextel Cup debut, qualified 29th, but finished 34th after his car hit the wall after being clipped by Ryan Newman and caught fire on lap 251. This would be the final year that Kyle Petty ran every race in a season. Jimmie Johnson clinched his first Nextel Cup Championship, winning the title by 56 points over Matt Kenseth. This was the final race to be broadcast by NBC until the 2015 Coke Zero 400, as well as the final race to be commentated by Benny Parsons who died less than 2 months after this event in early 2007.

Top ten results: (Race extended to 268 laps/402 miles due to green-white-checkered rule.)
 No. 16 Greg Biffle
 No. 1 Martin Truex Jr. *
 No. 11 Denny Hamlin *•
 No. 9 Kasey Kahne •
 No. 29 Kevin Harvick •
 No. 17 Matt Kenseth •
 No. 10 Scott Riggs
 No. 99 Carl Edwards
 No. 48 Jimmie Johnson •°
 No. 07 Clint Bowyer

° – Clinched 2006 Nextel Cup Championship

Failed to qualify: Michael Waltrip (No. 55), Todd Kluever (No. 06), Ward Burton (No. 4), Brandon Whitt (No. 72), Kenny Wallace (No. 78), Mike Skinner (No. 27), Derrike Cope (No. 74), Kevin Lepage (No. 61), Carl Long (No. 46), Chad Chaffin (No. 34), Casey Atwood (No. 95), David Ragan (No. 60) Note: Morgan Shepherd (No. 89) withdrew after his only car crashed during practice.

Full Drivers' Championship 

(key) Bold - Pole position awarded by time. Italics - Pole position set by owner's points standings. * – Most laps led.

Rookies 
 Clint Bowyer, No. 07 Chevrolet (Richard Childress Racing)
 Denny Hamlin, No. 11 Chevrolet (Joe Gibbs Racing) --winner of the Raybestos Rookie of the Year award
 David Stremme, No. 40 Dodge (Chip Ganassi Racing with Felix Sabates)
 Martin Truex Jr., No. 1 Chevrolet (Dale Earnhardt, Inc.)
 Brent Sherman, released from No. 49 Dodge (BAM Racing)
 Reed Sorenson, No. 41 Dodge (Chip Ganassi Racing with Felix Sabates)
 J. J. Yeley, No. 18 Chevrolet (Joe Gibbs Racing)

The battle for ROTY was not expected to be fierce, as many predicted that two time Busch Series champion Martin Truex Jr. would handily win the award, and possibly be a Chase contender. However, this was not to be as Joe Gibbs Racing driver Denny Hamlin shocked the NASCAR world the previous year by winning his first career pole at Phoenix while driving a part-time schedule. Hamlin again got everyone's attention by not only having won the Bud Shootout in his first attempt, but became the first rookie to sweep a racetrack (Pocono Raceway) since Jimmie Johnson accomplished that same feat at Dover. As Hamlin ran away with ROTY, his other competitors had up and down years. Although Clint Bowyer scored a surprising Top 10 finish at Daytona, he was not a factor. Hamlin's teammate, J. J. Yeley struggled mightily. Ganassi rookie Reed Sorenson had an up and down year, scoring his first top five at Michigan but was plagued by bad breaks. David Stremme was constantly fighting to stay within the top 35 in owners points throughout the year, and Brent Sherman was released from his ride with BAM Racing 1/3 into the year. So Denny Hamlin won the Raybestos Rookie of the Year award.

NASCAR Hall of Fame 
Until March 6, 2006, NASCAR was without a recognized Hall of Fame. Charlotte, North Carolina, where most NASCAR teams are based near, was chosen as the location over six other candidates, which included Atlanta, Georgia; Talladega, Alabama; Kansas City, Kansas; Detroit, Michigan; Richmond, Virginia and Daytona Beach, Florida. The NASCAR Hall of Fame opened in 2010.

Television 
The 2006 season marked the final year of television contracts with Fox / FX / Speed and NBC / TNT. NBC aired the Daytona 500 to officially start the season on February 19, with Fox/FX picking up coverage the following week in California up to the Pepsi 400 July 1. For 2007, Fox and TNT began new eight-year contracts while ESPN / ABC joined in, taking over for NBC.

See also 
 2006 NASCAR Busch Series
 2006 NASCAR Craftsman Truck Series

References

External links 
 Racing Reference

 
NASCAR Cup Series seasons